Reduction of Hours of Work Convention may refer to:

 Reduction of Hours of Work (Glass-Bottle Works) Convention, 1935 (shelved)
 Reduction of Hours of Work (Public Works) Convention, 1936
 Reduction of Hours of Work (Textiles) Convention, 1937

It may also refer to:
 Hours of Work (Commerce and Offices) Convention, 1930
 Hours of Work (Industry) Convention, 1919
 Hours of Work and Manning (Sea) Convention, 1936

See also 
 Reduction of hours of work (disambiguation)